Nicholas Haydon (born 10 August 1978) is an English former footballer who played in the Football League as a defender or as a midfielder for Colchester United.

Career

Born in Barking, London, Haydon signed for Colchester United as an apprentice and broke into the first team at the end of the 1996–97 season. He made his debut on 3 May 1997 in a 4–2 away win over Barnet, coming on as a substitute for Adam Locke after 81 minutes. He scored five minutes after coming on, one of only two goals for the club. He made a further 37 appearances for the first team, scoring his second and final goal in a 4–2 away victory at Wrexham on 15 August 1998. His final appearance for the club came on 15 January 1999 in a 3–1 home defeat against Wrexham.

Haydon was released by Colchester in the summer of 1999, joining up with Norwich City on trial in July and impressing in reserve games with Arsenal and Ipswich Town. Manager Bruce Rioch decided not to sign Haydon, and instead signed a short-term deal with Leyton Orient where he failed to make an appearance. Haydon then signed for Conference side Kettering Town, He made seven appearances for Kettering between August and September 1999

After leaving Kettering, Haydon returned to Essex to play for Heybridge Swifts in the Isthmian League. He was placed on the transfer-list in January 2001 by the club and signed for Chelmsford City in February, before rejoining Swifts again in September 2001. By the summer of 2002, Haydon was on the move again, this time to Braintree Town, spending one season with the club. He signed for Wivenhoe Town in early 2003. In the summer of 2003, Haydon was appointed player-coach of Wivenhoe.

References

1978 births
Living people
Footballers from Barking, London
English footballers
Association football defenders
Association football midfielders
Colchester United F.C. players
Leyton Orient F.C. players
Kettering Town F.C. players
Heybridge Swifts F.C. players
Chelmsford City F.C. players
Braintree Town F.C. players
Wivenhoe Town F.C. players
English Football League players
National League (English football) players
Isthmian League players